Metropolitan Ilarion (secular name Ivan Ivanovich Ohienko; ; 2 January (14 January), 1882 in Brusilov, Kiev Governorate – 29 March 1972 in Winnipeg, Manitoba, Canada) was a Ukrainian Orthodox cleric, linguist, church historian, and historian of Ukrainian culture. In 1940 he was Archimandrite of the St. Onuphrius Monastery in Jableczna; in 1940 he became Bishop of Chełm; in 1944 he became the Metropolitan of Chełm and Lublin (Podlaskie), and in 1951 Primate of the Ukrainian Orthodox Church of Canada). He was also active in Ukrainian politics, both during the revolution and later in emigration.

Early life 
Ivan Ohienko was born in central Ukraine (Kiev Gubernia) and educated at Kiev University where he studied Slavic philology (see Slavistics) under V. Peretts. By 1915, he was teaching at this same university, and during the revolution became active in the Ukrainianization of higher education. In 1919, he was Minister of Education in the Ukrainian People's Republic (UPR) which was at that time headed by the Directorate of Ukraine. After the military defeat of Petliura's forces, together with Petliura he went into exile in Tarnów, Poland. He remained in Poland between the wars and remained active in the UPR government in exile. Until 1932, he taught in the Faculty of Orthodox Theology at Warsaw University, but was dismissed under political pressure from Polish nationalist elements.

Bishop 
In 1940, he became Bishop of Chełm in German-occupied Poland.

In face of the advance of the Red Army, he fled west and in 1947 settled in Winnipeg in Western Canada where shortly afterward he became Metropolitan bishop of the Ukrainian Orthodox Church of Canada. Throughout his long career, in addition to church work, Ohienko contributed to scholarship and other areas of Ukrainian culture.

Scholarly work 

As a scholar, Ohienko made contributions to Ukrainian linguistics, church history, and the history of Ukrainian culture. He published books on the history of Ukrainian linguistics (1907), the history of Ukrainian printing (1925), the pre-Christian beliefs of the Ukrainian people (1965), the history of the Ukrainian literary language (1950), and published several studies in Ukrainian church history of the Cossack era. He also published a general history of the Ukrainian Church (1942), a two volume work on Saints Cyril and Methodius (1927–28), edited several semi-scholarly journals, and compiled a multi-volume etymological-semantic dictionary of the Ukrainian language which was only published after his death. Most of the works first published in Poland were reprinted in Winnipeg during the Cold War, and then, again, in Ukraine after the re-establishment of independence in 1991.
 The Divine Liturgy of our Holy Father John Chrysostom, in the Ukrainian language — Part I, Text: Proskomidia, Divine Liturgy, Prayers following Holy Communion. (L'viv, 1922);
 The Divine Liturgy of our Holy Father John Chrysostom, in the Ukrainian language — Part II, Explanation of the Text, Translation Methodology of Divine service books into Ukrainian,    Explanatory notes on the translation of the Liturgy of St. John Chrysostom, Alphabetical list of corresponding Church Slavonic words, List of publications of the Non-profit Publishing House Ukrainian Autocephalous Church under the direction of Prof. Ivan Ohienko. (L'viv, 1922);
 Holy Vespers. (L'viv, 1922);
 Compline and Midnight Service. (L'viv, 1922);
 Holy Matins Service. (L'viv, 1922);
 Little Vespers, Holy All-night Vigil, Saturday Midnight Service, Sunday Midnight Service. (L'viv, 1922);
 First Hour, Third Hour, Sixth Hour, Ninth Hour. (L'viv, 1922);
 Great Compline. (L'viv, 1922);
 Daily Dismissals, Dismissals at Feasts of the Lord, Troparia and Kondakia at Feasts throughout the year, Festal Prokeimena at Orthros Services. (L'viv, 1922);
 Matins Gospels. (L'viv, 1922);
 Prayer of Thanksgiving of St. Ambrose, Bishop of Mediolanum, Nationalisation of theological texts, Afterword, Table of Contents, Errata. (L'viv, 1922);
 Byzantium and Ukraine (1954);

Political activities 

A political moderate, during the revolution, Ohienko was a member of the Ukrainian Party of Socialists-Federalists. He was a populist committed to bringing the church closer to the common people, spreading the achievements of scholarship among wider circles of the public, and narrowing the gap between the literary language and the vernacular. Always firmly committed to Eastern Orthodoxy, some of his works betray a polemical anti-Catholic tone, but he never acceded to the ecclesiastical or political claims of Moscow (see Moscow Patriarchy) and to his death in 1972 remained a strong supporter of Ukrainian church autocephaly and Ukrainian political independence.

Ohienko Bible 

Between 1917 and 1940, he also realized a translation of the Bible into the Ukrainian language, finally published in 1958. His translation of the Gospels became available in 1937, and the rest of the New Testament and the Psalms in 1939.  His Ukrainian translation is the one most widely used nowadays, with Ukrainian Bible Society starting to publish mass editions in 1995. Before that, his translation was mainly being published in the USA, Canada, and Western Europe.

References
 
 Огієнко Іван Іванович  in the Hand-book on the History of Ukraine 
 Ohiienko, Ivan at the Encyclopedia of Ukraine

External links

 Ohienko Bible online 

1882 births
1972 deaths
People from Zhytomyr Oblast
People from Radomyslsky Uyezd
Taras Shevchenko National University of Kyiv alumni
Kiev Military Medical School alumni
Linguists from Ukraine
Ukrainian historians of religion
Ukrainian emigrants to Canada
Primates of the Ukrainian Orthodox Church of Canada
Translators of the Bible into Ukrainian
Ukrainianists
Education ministers of Ukraine
Ukrainian Democratic Party (1904) politicians
20th-century Ukrainian politicians
20th-century  Ukrainian historians
20th-century translators
20th-century linguists